Afropesa is a genus of southern African mygalomorph spiders in the family Entypesidae. It was first described by S. L. Zonstein and D. Ríos-Tamayo in 2021, and it has only been found in South Africa.  it contains only three species: A. gauteng, A. schoutedeni, and A. schwendingeri. The type species was originally described under the name "Entypesa schoutedeni.

See also
 Entypesa
 List of Entypesidae species

References

Further reading

Entypesidae
Mygalomorphae genera
Spiders of South Africa